Scotch were an Italian Italo disco band, formed in Bergamo in 1982, that comprised Vince Lancini, Fabio Margutti, Franz Rome, Franz Felleti and Manlio Cangelli.

History 

Scotch was created by David Zambelli and Walter Verdi, both record producers from Bergamo. The group's first success was "Penguins' Invasion", written by Manlio Cangelli. "Penguins' Invasion" was an instrumental piece. About three months after its release, it was decided to create a vocal version and Vince Lancini was chosen as singer. Later he joined the group with Fabio Margutti and Vince Lancini.

Among their most known tracks are "Take Me Up", "Disco Band", "Mirage", "Delirio Mind", "Penguins' Invasion", "Evolution", "Plus Plus", "Money Runner", "Pictures" and "Man to Man".

The band had numerous hits, including the 1984 single "Disco Band" which was a major hit in Germany and other countries. That same year, they released their first album, Evolution.

"Evolution" was the next single which was a huge hit in Sweden. Other songs were "Plus Plus" and "Money Runner".

"Disco Band" was sampled on Scooter's 2007 hit single "Lass uns tanzen", and "Penguins' Invasion" continues to be popular, appearing on various Italo disco compilations and retrospectives.

Discography 

 Evolution (1985)
 Pictures of Old Days (1987)

Singles 
 1983: "Penguins' Invasion"
 1983: "Penguins' Invasion" (vocal, 12")
 1984: "Disco Band" – #28 Italy, #3 Germany, #20 Sweden, #4 Switzerland, #1 Austria, #4 Portugal
 1985: "Delirio Mind"  – #6 Germany, #5 Sweden, #19 Switzerland
 1985: "Take Me Up" – #19 Germany, #11 Portugal
 1986: "Mirage" – #19 Italy, #56 Germany, #2 Sweden
 1986: "Money Runner" – #12 Sweden
 1986: "Pictures" – #16 Sweden
 1987: "Man to Man"

Citations

External links 

 

1982 establishments in Italy
1987 disestablishments in Italy
Italo disco groups
Italian pop music groups
Musical groups established in 1982
Musical groups disestablished in 1987
Musical groups from Bergamo